Byron Álvarez (born October 21, 1978, in Mexico City, Mexico) is a Mexican former professional footballer who played as a forward. He was the 2010–2011 MISL Most Valuable Player.

Early life
Alvarez began playing football at sixteen.  He appeared with a string of minor league Mexican clubs including Reboceros de La Piedad, Jaiba Brava de Tamaulipas, Astros de Ciudad Juárez, and C.F. Tambico.

Club career
In 2002, he signed with the MetroStars of Major League Soccer.  In 2003, he moved to the Portland Timbers of the USL First Division.  On September 29, 2004, the Chicago Storm of the Major Indoor Soccer League (MISL) traded Kevin Sakuda to the San Diego Sockers for the rights to Alvarez.  On October 18, 2004, the Storm signed him on loan from the Timbers and he played the 2004–2005 and 2005–2006 indoor seasons in Chicago.  Following the 2006 USL-1 season, Alvarez became a free agent and on April 3, 2007, signed with the Charleston Battery of USL-1.  He played twenty-two games and scored eight goals.  On July 9, 2007, the Monterrey La Raza of MISL selected Alvarez in the MISL expansion draft.  The LaRaza went to the MISL championship series, but fell to the Baltimore Blast.  Following the end of the indoor season, he contacted Gavin Wilkinson, coach of the Timbers, about the possibility of rejoining the Timbers.  Alvarez signed with the Timbers on July 14, 2008.  He played only nine games with the Timbers and returned to the LaRaza which was now playing in the newly created National Indoor Soccer League.  On April 7, 2009, he was announced as the 2008-09 NISL Most Valuable Player.

Alvarez has also played for the Mexican national futsal team.

On October 25, 2010, The Missouri Comets announced they had signed Byron Alvarez to play in their first season back in the MISL.  Alvarez was vital to the Comets run to the MISL playoffs, leading the team and the league in scoring with 80 points. Alvarez also led the league in goals scored (33), hat tricks (5) and tied for the league-lead in game-winning goals with five. Alvarez scored at least one point in 17 games this season and he also posted the longest goal-scoring streak of the year (nine games) and point-scoring streak (15 games). He capped off this great season by being named 2010–2011 MISL MVP.

References

External links
 Portland Timbers profile
 2003 Timberlog Interview

1977 births
Living people
Footballers from Mexico City
Association football forwards
Yakima Reds players
La Piedad footballers
Tampico Madero F.C. footballers
Indios de Ciudad Juárez footballers
New York Red Bulls players
Portland Timbers (2001–2010) players
Chicago Storm players
Charleston Battery players
Monterrey La Raza players
Missouri Comets players
Mexican expatriate footballers
Mexican expatriate sportspeople in the United States
Expatriate soccer players in the United States
Major Indoor Soccer League (2001–2008) players
Major League Soccer players
A-League (1995–2004) players
USL First Division players
USL League Two players
Major Indoor Soccer League (2008–2014) players
Wichita B-52s
Mexican men's futsal players
Mexican footballers